Emam Darreh (also Romanized as Emām Darreh) is a village in Raz Rural District, Raz and Jargalan District, Bojnord County, North Khorasan Province, Iran. At the 2006 census, its population was 210, in 47 families.

References 

Populated places in Bojnord County